The Duke in the Suburbs is a 1909 novel by the British writer Edgar Wallace.

Unusually for Wallace, best known for his heavy thrillers, it is a comedy about a Duke who goes to live in a street in the suburbs and the impact he has on the pretentious middle-class residents. It has been described as Wodehousian in style.

References

Bibliography
 Sandra Kemp, Charlotte Mitchell & David Trotter. Edwardian Fiction: An Oxford Companion. Oxford University Press, 1997.

External links
 

1909 British novels
British comedy novels
Novels by Edgar Wallace